Monique Bernatchez Tardif (born 8 January 1936) was a Progressive Conservative member of the House of Commons of Canada. She was an administrator by career.

Tardif represented the Quebec riding of Charlesbourg where she was first elected in the 1984 federal election and re-elected in 1988, therefore becoming a member in the 33rd and 34th Canadian Parliaments. She was defeated in the 1993 election by Jean-Marc Jacob of the Bloc Québécois.

External links
 

1936 births
Living people
Members of the House of Commons of Canada from Quebec
Politicians from Quebec City
Progressive Conservative Party of Canada MPs
Women members of the House of Commons of Canada
Women in Quebec politics